The SIAI S.51, Savoia Marchetti S.51 or Savoia S.51 was an Italian racing flying boat built by SIAI for the 1922 Schneider Trophy race.

Design and development
The S.51 was a single-seat sesquiplane flying boat. It was powered by a single  Hispano-Suiza 8F V8 engine, mounted on two N struts above the hull and below the upper wing, which drove a two-bladed propeller in a pusher configuration. The inclined interplane struts were mounted in a V configuration. The lower wings had small stabilizing floats mounted on inclined struts so that they hung below and outboard of the outer tips of the lower wing.

SIAI later based the design of the hull of its S.58 flying boat fighter of 1924 on that of the S.51s hull.

Operational history
Italy entered the S.51 in the 1922 Schneider Trophy race along with two Macchi M.17 flying boats in competition with a British Supermarine Sea Lion II flying boat. The race was held at Naples on 12 August.

The S.51 capsized in an accident during the seaworthiness trials before the race. Righted by its crew, it completed the race, piloted by Alessandro Passaleva but could only take second place, with the Sea Lion a comfortable 2 min 22 s ahead.

Operators

Specifications

See also

Notes

References
Schneider Trophy 6th Edition August 1922
Society of Air Racing Historians: Schneider Cup Races
ipmsairrace.org
Green, William, and Gordon Swanborough. The Complete Book of Fighters: An Illustrated Encyclopedia of Every Fighter Aircraft Built and Flown. New York: SMITHMARK Publishers, 1994. .
Vašiček, Radko. "When Seaplanes Ruled the Sky." Aviation History, September 2002

External links 

Artwork of Savoia S.51 by Hideaki Ozawa

S.51
Flying boats
Sesquiplanes
Single-engined pusher aircraft
1920s Italian sport aircraft
Schneider Trophy
Aircraft first flown in 1922